Nototanaidae is a family of crustaceans belonging to the order Tanaidacea.

Genera:
 Birdotanais Kakui & Angsupanich, 2012
 Gamboa Bamber, 2012
 Leptotanais
 Nesotanais Shiino, 1968
 Nototanais Richardson, 1906
 Nototanoides Sieg & Heard, 1985
 Paranesotanais Larsen & Shimomura, 2008
 Stachyops Bird, 2012

References

Tanaidacea
Crustacean families